The 40th edition of the annual Vuelta a Venezuela was held from September 8 to September 21, 2003. The stage race started in Tucupita, and ended in San Felipe, Yaracuy.

Stages

2003-09-08: Tucupita Circuito (93 km)

2003-09-09: Tucupita — Maturín (191.4 km)

2003-09-10: Punta de Mata — Pariaguán (196.6 km)

2003-09-11: Pariaguán — Valle de la Pascua (165.4 km)

2003-09-12: Valle de la Pascua — El Socorro (38.6 km)

2003-09-12: Valle de la Pascua Circuito (73 km)

2003-09-13: El Sombrero — Maracay (159 km)

2003-09-14: Valencia Circuito (78 km)

2003-09-14: Los Guayos — Tinaco (99.7 km)

2003-09-15: San Carlos de Austria — Guanare (164.2 km)

2003-09-16: Socopó — San Cristóbal (210.2 km)

2003-09-17: La Fría — Santa Cruz de Mora (131.4 km)

2003-09-18: El Vigía — El Dividive (163.1 km)

2003-09-19: El Dividive — Carora (140.7 km)

2003-09-20: Carora — San Pablo de Yaracuy (179.3 km)

2003-09-21: San Felipe Circuito (129 km)

Final classification

References 
 cyclingnews

Vuelta a Venezuela
Venezuela
Vuelta Venezuela